Pichet Durongkaveroj is a former Thai politician. He was the Minister of Science and Technology and Minister of Digital Economy and Society in the first cabinet of Prime Minister Prayut Chan-o-cha.

Education 
Pichet graduated from high school from Assumption College. He has a B.E. in electrical engineering from the University of New South Wales in Australia and a M.Eng.Sc. in applied solar energy from Trinity University, United States. He received his Ph.D. in public policy and management from the Wharton School of the University of Pennsylvania, United States.

Careers 
Pichet was a lecturer at King Mongkut's University of Technology Thonburi and previously held the position of director of the Secretariat Office of National Information Technology Committee from 1993 to 1997. He was the director of the Electronic Commerce Development Center from 1999 to 2001 and chaired the ASEAN Working Group on Information and Communication Technology from 2001 to 2003. In 2003, he was appointed director of the Knowledge Network Institute of Thailand and, in 2009, he was appointed secretary-general of the National Science Technology and Innovation Policy Office, Ministry of Science and Technology.

In 2014, he was appointed Minister of Science and Technology in the government of Prayut Chan-o-cha. In 2016, he was appointed Minister of Digital Economy and Society.

Since July 2020, he has been an independent director of the board of directors of Bangkok Bank.

Royal decorations 
Pichet has received the following royal decorations in the honours system of Thailand:
  Knight Grand Cordon (Special Class) of The Most Noble Order of the Crown of Thailand
  Knight Grand Cordon (Special Class) of the Most Exalted Order of the White Elephant
  Knight Grand Cross (First Class) of Order of the White Elephant

References 

Living people
1955 births
Place of birth missing (living people)
Pichet Durongkaveroj
Pichet Durongkaveroj
University of New South Wales alumni
Wharton School of the University of Pennsylvania alumni
Pichet Durongkaveroj